Labial nerves can refer:

 Posterior labial nerves, branches of the pudendal nerve
 Anterior labial nerves, branches of the ilioinguinal nerve
 Superior labial nerve, a branch of the maxillary nerve